Pro Natura, founded in 1909 in Basel as Swiss League for the Protection of Nature, is the oldest environmental organisation in Switzerland.

Pro Natura takes care of about 700 nature reserves of various sizes throughout Switzerland (250 square kilometres, of which 60 square kilometres are owned by Pro Natura).

History 

In 1909, representatives of the Swiss Society of Natural Sciences founded the Swiss League for the Protection of Nature (German: Schweizerischen Bund für Naturschutz, French: Ligue suisse pour la protection de la nature) to fund and create the Swiss National Park (inaugurated in 1914). In 2000, Pro Natura launched a campaign supporting the creation of a second Swiss National Park.

In 1947, the Swiss League for the Protection of Nature organised an international conference on the protection of nature in Brunnen. It resulted in the creation of the International Union for Conservation of Nature in 1948.

Between 1958 and 1963, the Swiss League for the Protection of Nature, together with the Swiss Heritage Society and the Swiss Alpine Club, established an inventory of landscapes and natural sites of national importance. Based on it, the Swiss Federal Council published the Federal Inventory of Landscapes and Natural Monuments in 1977.

Since 1995, Pro Natura has been a member of the global environmental network Friends of the Earth. In 1997, the Swiss League for the Protection of Nature adopted the name Pro Natura.

Objectives 

The four main objectives of Pro Natura are:
 Enhance biodiversity
 Ensure the landscape identities
 Conserving natural resources
 Increase the relationship with nature

They reach their objectives through:
 Protection of nature at the political level (campaigns, federal popular initiatives, etc.)
 Nature protection in the field (nature reserves)
 Environmental education (nature centres, activities for schools, etc.)
 Communication (Pro Natura magazine)

Controversies 
In 2020, 3 women left the Vaud division of Pro Natura, after having been subjected in 2018 and 2019 to behaviors cited as humiliating and demeaning by the executive secretary Michel Bongard. Although relieved of certain managerial functions, Bongard remains in office. According to the president of the Vaud chapter, Serge Fischer, who mentioned the possibility of filing a complaint because a confidentiality agreement had been established with the victims, the problem is limited to managerial errors.  Despite the introduction of a charter for equality in December 2019, women remain a significant minority at the head of the organization.

Other 

Pro Natura also draws public attention to grievances. The foundation started a media campaign in November 2014 calling for action by the federal authorities regarding excess inventory in the structures for breeding livestock and the eutrophication of fields, which has increased massively since the 1990s, particularly in the case of phosphorus.

Notes and references

See also 
 Nature parks in Switzerland
 Environmental movement in Switzerland

External links 

 
 

Nature conservation organisations based in Europe
Environmental organisations based in Switzerland
Protected areas of Switzerland
Organisations based in Basel
Friends of the Earth
Swiss Climate Alliance
1909 establishments in Switzerland